Martin Luther King Jr. Way may be:

Martin Luther King Jr. Way (Berkeley)
Martin Luther King Jr. Way (Seattle)

See also
List of streets named after Martin Luther King Jr.
Martin Luther King Jr. Boulevard (disambiguation)
Martin Luther King Jr. Drive (disambiguation)
Martin Luther King Jr. Expressway (disambiguation)
Martin Luther King Jr. Parkway (disambiguation)